Asian Boss is a YouTube channel, founded in 2013, which discusses various issues related to Asia.

History 
Asian Boss was founded in 2013 by Stephen Park, a former corporate lawyer, and Kei Ibaraki, a former architect, after they witnessed the "growing divide" in society. Neither of them had video editing experience at the time and they studied by watching tutorials on YouTube.

According to Park, many of the videos were demonetized by YouTube for being politically sensitive, and they relied on investors to fund their operations.

In a 2019 interview, Ibaraki noted that since there was significant bias in the media on certain topics, the channel would stay as neutral as possible to allow the subjects to speak freely, and would go to great lengths to find respondents with opposing opinions. The channel is targeted to an English-speaking global audience interested in Asia, and 30 percent of the its views came from the United States.

In 2020, The Japan Times named Asian Boss as an example of overseas-based YouTube channels which attempt to gain real insight into the lives and opinions of Japanese people.

In January 2021, Park revealed in a video that the channel was close to shutting down, as many of their investors have gone out of business, and announced the channel's GoFundMe page, which has a funding goal of $700,000. As of February 4, 2021 more than $745,000 in donations has been received.

Controversies 
In 2019, the channel released a video interviewing the people of Beijing on whether actor Simu Liu was "too ugly" to portray superhero Shang-Chi in Shang-Chi and the Legend of the Ten Rings, which would be released in 2021. Liu responded to the video by calling it a "very teachable moment" about facing rejection and doubt of others, and suggested that the channel should tackle topics with "more journalistic and creative integrity" in the future. The video has since been removed from YouTube. In January 2021 a Filipino actor of the Korean TV series Squid Game complained in a video of Asian Boss about discrimination in Korea.

In 2022, the channel was accused by news outlet Taiwan News of "pre-screening" street interviewees in Taiwan for pro-Kuomintang viewpoints, in a claimed bid to present balanced viewpoints in a video about Cross-Strait relations. The report claims the channel advertised on Taiwanese forums looking for people with pro-Kuomintang viewpoints. In a Facebook post, one of the interviewees revealed that he was a pro-blue Youtuber who was contacted by Asian Boss for an interview; during the interview, he was requested to appear to be someone they approached on the street.

References

External links 

 Official website

YouTube channels
YouTube channels launched in 2013